A hoggan or hogen is a type of flatbread containing pieces of pork, and sometimes potato, historically eaten by Cornish miners in the eighteenth and nineteenth centuries. Any food eaten by miners had to be tough to withstand the harsh conditions of the mines, and hoggans were said by one mining captain to be 'hard as street tiles'.

A true hoggan is slightly different from a pasty. The dough which was left over from pasty making is made into a lump of unleavened dough, in which is embedded a morsel of green pork and sometimes a piece of potato. Historically, hoggans were often made from cheaper barley bread and have been a good indicator of poverty, reappearing when wheat prices are high. 

A sweet version made of flour and raisins is known as a fuggan or figgy hobbin. Fig is a Cornish dialect word pertaining to raisins.

The name is sometimes given to a pork pasty which is where the term oggie or tiddy oggie derives. A Hobban, or Hoggan-bag, was the name given to miners' dinner-bag.

See also

Oggy Oggy Oggy

References

External links
Figgy 'obbin recipe from the Wiki cookbook

British pies
Cornish cuisine
Flatbreads
Potato dishes
Savoury pies
Unleavened breads
British pork dishes